Artur Andrzej Marciniak (born August 18, 1987) is a Polish professional footballer who plays as a midfielder.

Career

Club
In January 2011, he joined Warta Poznań on a half-year deal.

National team
He also plays in Poland's youth teams, including as captain of the Polish side during the 2007 FIFA U-20 World Cup.

References

External links
 

1987 births
Footballers from Poznań
Living people
Polish footballers
Poland youth international footballers
Association football midfielders
Lech Poznań players
GKS Bełchatów players
Warta Poznań players
Miedź Legnica players
Lech Poznań II players
Ekstraklasa players
I liga players
II liga players
III liga players